The Stony Point line is a greater-metropolitan commuter railway line in the city of Melbourne, Victoria, Australia. The line acts as an extension of the Frankston line with services running from Frankston station to the small town of Stony Point in the south-east, serving 10 stations via Leawarra, Baxter, Hastings, and Bittern. The line operates for approximately ~13 hours a day (from approximately 5:30 am to around 10:30 pm) with no 24 hour service available on Friday and Saturday nights—unlike other lines on the metropolitan network. Headways of 90 to 120 minutes are operated throughout the day due to limited patronage and infrastructure constraints. Trains on the Stony Point line run as two one-car formations of V/Line Sprinters. 

Sections of the Stony Point line opened as early as 1888, with the line fully extended to Stony Point in 1889. Only two stations have opened since its extension in the 1880s—Leawarra and Morradoo. The line was built to connect Melbourne and Frankston with the rural towns of Baxter, Hastings, and Bittern, amongst others. The line also facilitates freight services to the Port of Hastings. Significant growth has occurred since opening, with a plan to extend the Frankston line along part of the Stony Point line to Baxter.

History

19th century 
The Stony Point line initially operated from Frankston to Baxter station, with services commencing in 1888. Extensions to Hastings, Bittern, and Stony Point were completed the following year in 1889. Branch lines were opened from Baxter to Mornington in 1889 and from Bittern to Red Hill in 1921.

20th century 
A new station was opened at Leawarra in 1906 and Morradoo in 1960.

The Red Hill line was closed in 1953 with the Mornington line remaining until 1981. Passenger services on the entire line were withdrawn on 10 June 1981, and the line from Long Island Junction to Stony Point was closed on 22 June 1981. Services however recommenced on 26 September 1984. Upon the reopening, DRC railcars were used, with two MTH carriages present in between them making up a 4 car train. The DRC railcars were frequently used, either in multiple or with MTH trailer cars. Frequent breakdowns saw diesel locomotives called in to haul the consist instead.

In August 1994, a T class with two MTH carriages were used, but by November 1995, weekday services were being operated by a P class with 2 MTH carriages, with an A class used on weekends with an extra MTH car. On another occasion in November 1995, an X class diesel locomotive in the V/Line Freight livery was used with three MTH carriages. These configurations disappeared after V/Line was separated into passenger and freight divisions.

21st century 

By the 2000s, the service had settled down, with little change occurring in the 21st century. On a limited number of occasions, V/Line underwent locomotive shortages, with additional trains leased from Freight Australia and later Pacific National appearing on the lines in their green and yellow livery. In 2008, the Stony Point line underwent major re-signalling works including the introduction of three position signalling for the first time on the line. The new signalling system was now controlled remotely by the Frankston Signal Box.

On 1 April 2015, passenger services were suspended indefinitely following a series of safety breaches where boom gates failed to drop for an approaching train. After three months of remedial works, passenger services returned to the line on 30 June 2015. Later in April 2008, diesel railcars were again introduced on the line. The rolling stock introduced was Sprinter units originally purchased by V/Line in 1993. Two units usually operate the service, with a single unit returning to Southern Cross for servicing on a regular basis, with another sent in the opposite direction to replace it. The units are selected from the normal V/Line fleet, and are not dedicated to operate the Stony Point service. Locks were installed on toilet doors to prevent their use when in operation with Metro Trains Melbourne. The Stony Point line was the last suburban service in Australia to be operated by a locomotive hauled train.

Baxter extension 

In 2013, as part of Public Transport Victoria's Network Development Plan for metropolitan rail, an extension of the Frankston line to Baxter was earmarked to begin in the "long-term", which would equate to at least over the next 20 years. In 2018, the Liberal Party announced a project to extend electrified services to Baxter during the 2018 state election.The project would have included the removal of all crossings between Frankston and Baxter, duplication and electrification works, the construction of one (or two) new stations, and the reconstruction of stations along the corridor. The Federal Liberals announced $450 million of joint funding for the project promised between the state and federal governments. The incumbent Andrews Labor government argued that the project wasn't needed, instead prioritising funding to other projects across the state.

A business case commissioned by the government was completed in 2019 with no further progress being made.

Again in the lead up to the 2022 state election, the Liberal opposition supported the electrification to Baxter. The incumbent Andrews government made no commitments to the Baxter rail extension, instead continuing construction on level crossing removal works along the Frankston line. The 2022 state election resulted in another Labor victory, with the Andrews government pushing ahead with these works, with the extension to Baxter remaining stagnate ever since.

Network and operations

Services 
Services on the Stony Point line operates from approximately 5:30 am to around 10:30 pm Monday to Friday, with operating hours from ~7:00 am till ~8:30 pm on Saturdays and Sundays. Train frequency is typically every 90 to 120 minutes throughout the day due to the presence of a single track. Services don't run past Frankston, instead operating a shuttle-style services between Frankston and Stony Point. Unlike the rest of Melbournes rail network, services do not run 24 hours a day on Friday nights and weekends.

Freight operations occur (usually) twice-daily, with Qube Holdings operating services to the Long Island steel mills and the Port of Hastings. Trains to Melbourne run approximately at 4 am and during the mid-afternoon, while trains from Melbourne run approximately at midnight and noon.

Train services on the Stony Point line are also subjected to maintenance and renewal works, usually on selected Fridays and Saturdays. Shuttle bus services are provided throughout the duration of works for affected commuters.

Stopping patterns 
Legend — Station status
 ◼ Premium Station – Station staffed from first to last train
 ◻ Host Station – Usually staffed during morning peak, however this can vary for different stations on the network.

Legend — Stopping patterns
 ● – All trains stop
 ◐ – Some services do not stop
 | – Trains pass and do not stop

Operators 
The Stony Point line has had numerous operators with since its opening in 1889. Victorian Railways, the State Transport Authority, and the Public Transport Corporation operated the line from 1889 till the privatisation of the Melbourne rail network in 1997. V/Line operated the service from 1997 till 2000 and since then, have operated the service on behalf of three different private operators—M>Train, Connex, and Metro Trains.

Route 

The Stony Point line forms a somewhat linear route from the Frankston station to its terminus in the small town of Stony Point. After changing from the Frankston line at Frankston station, the Stony Point line traverses mainly flat country with few curves and fairly minimal earthworks for most of the line. Many level crossings are still present on the line with no plans to remove any as part of the Level Crossing Removal Project.

After Frankston, most of the rail line goes through smaller suburbs and some industrial areas, with large sections of the line passing through more open countryside, passing by open fields and farms.

Stations 
The line serves 10 stations across  of track. All stations are at ground level.

Infrastructure

Rolling stock 

The Stony Point line uses V/Line Sprinter diesel multiple unit (DMU) trains operating in a one or two-car configuration, with two doors per side on each carriage and can accommodate of up to 90 passengers in each train-set. The trains are shared with other V/Line regional train routes, and subsequently receive refuelling and servicing near Southern Cross station. The trains were originally built between 1993 and 1995 with a total of 22 constructed.

Alongside the passenger trains, Stony Point line tracks and equipment are maintained by a fleet of engineering trains. The three types of engineering trains are: the shunting train; designed for moving trains along non-electrified corridors and for transporting other maintenance locomotives, for track evaluation; designed for evaluating track and its condition, and the infrastructure evaluation carriage designed for general infrastructure evaluation. Most of these trains are repurposed locomotives previously used by V/Line, Metro Trains, and the Southern Shorthaul Railroad.

Accessibility 
In compliance with the Disability Discrimination Act of 1992, all stations that are new-built or rebuilt are fully accessible and comply with these guidelines. All stations on the corridor are fully accessible—a first in Melbourne. The stations feature ramps that have a gradient less than 1 in 14, have at-grade paths, or feature lifts. These stations typically also feature tactile boarding indicators, independent boarding ramps, wheelchair accessible myki barriers, hearing loops, and widened paths.

Signalling 
The Stony Point line uses three position signalling which is widely used across the Melbourne train network. Three position signalling was fully introduced on the corridor in March 2008.

References

External links 
 Stony Point line timetable
 Network map
 

Railway lines in Melbourne
Railway lines opened in 1888
Transport in the Shire of Mornington Peninsula
Western Port
1888 establishments in Australia
Transport in the City of Frankston